Olayiwola Olabanji Kokumo, better known as Koker, is a Nigerian afro-pop singer and songwriter. He currently has a record deal with Chocolate City.

Early life
Koker was born on 30 may 1993 in Lagos State. He is the second child of his parents.

Education
He obtained a master's degree in creative arts from the University of Lagos.

Career 
The beginning of his journey to stardom began when he released the single "Do Something" in 2015. Influenced by the works of King Sunny Adé, Shina Peters and Ebenezer Obey, Koker's sound is a fusion of Afrobeat, Jùjú and Afro-Pop. Koker was featured on Chocolate City's 2015 compilation album, The Indestructible Choc Boi Nation.

In 2016, he signed an endorsement deal with Cloud 9, an online music streaming company based in Nigeria.

Back in 2016, Koker said he has never been embarrassed in his career and his performance with Sir Shina Peters was one of his most memorable experiences in his career.

Discography

Compilation albums

Singles

Awards and nominations

References

External links 
Koker Biography on Chocolate City

Nigerian male pop singers
Nigerian male singer-songwriters
Nigerian singer-songwriters
Musicians from Lagos
Entertainers from Ogun State
Living people
1993 births